Scott Davis and David Pate were the defending champions, but lost in the second round this year.

John Fitzgerald and Anders Järryd won in the final 3–6, 6–3, 6–2, against Kelly Jones and Rick Leach.

Seeds
All seeds receive a bye into the second round.

Draw

Finals

Top half

Bottom half

External links
 1991 Paris Open Doubles draw

1991 Paris Open
1991 ATP Tour